Kate Rich is an Australian-born artist and trader, currently living in Bristol, United Kingdom. Her practice includes sound art, video art, social practice, hospitality, and sport art.

Work 
In the 1990s Rich co-founded the Bureau of Inverse Technology (BIT) as an artist-engineer with Natalie Jeremijenko. Notable works include Feral Trade, The 'virtual' grocery business and public experiment is based trading goods over social networks. The word 'feral' describes a process which is "willfully wild (as in pigeon) as opposed to romantically or nature-wild (wolf)".  According to the artist, the passage of goods can open up wormholes between diverse social settings, routes along which other information, techniques or individuals can potentially travel. Her collaborative projects include Cube Cola, an open source cola laboratory, in collaboration with Bristol-based artist Kayle Brandon. Her work as part of the BIT was included in the 1997 Whitney Biennial.

Rich was a 2002 Artist-in-Residence at the McColl Center for Visual Art in Charlotte, NC. In 2007, she won the netarts.org grand prize from the Machida City Feral TradeMuseum of Graphic Arts, Machida, Japan. In 2008–2012 Kate Rich collaborated with FoAM on Food, Disaster Culture a cultural laboratory across European cities, in Sweden, the Netherlands, Belgium, and the U.K.

Articles

References 

http://www.arnolfini.org.uk/people/rich-kate

External links 
BIT
feraltrade.org
Cube-Cola.org

Living people
Australian contemporary artists
Year of birth missing (living people)
Australian women artists
Artists from Bristol